(Desired light of joy), 184, is a cantata by Johann Sebastian Bach for the Lutheran church service. He composed it in Leipzig for the third day of Pentecost (Whit Tuesday) and first performed it on 30 May 1724. It was probably based on an earlier secular cantata (BWV 184a). This work, mostly lost, was composed in Köthen as a duet cantata for soprano and bass with several dance movements.

Bach structured the Pentecost cantata in six movements and scored it for three solo voices, a four-part choir and Baroque instrumental ensemble of two flutes, strings and continuo. Unusually for Bach's church cantatas, the work is not concluded by a chorale: a setting of the final stanza of the hymn "" by Anarg zu Wildenfels is instead in the penultimate position, followed by a chorus. The dance influence from the secular model is reflected in the passepied-like second movement, the minuet of the fourth, and the gavotte of the last.

History and text 
Bach composed this cantata for Pentecost Tuesday, the third day of Pentecost. It was likely based on an earlier secular cantata for New Year's Day composed in Köthen (BWV 184a). The musicologist Szymon Paczkowski suggests two other possible occasions for the secular model: the birthday of Prince Leopold of Anhalt-Coethen on 10 December 1720, and the wedding of the prince and Friderica Henrietta on 11 December 1721.

The Bach scholar Alfred Dürr points out many similarities to : both were adapted from secular models, both written for Pentecost in Bach's first year in Leipzig, and both revived in 1731. It was a duet cantata, with several dance movements.

The prescribed readings for the feast day were from the Acts of the Apostles, the Holy Spirit in Samaria, and from the Gospel of John, the Good Shepherd. The poet who adapted a text to the existing music is unknown. He possibly kept the wording of the beginning of the opening recitative, continuing to describe Jesus as the shepherd of his "blissful flock". The librettist included as the penultimate movement of the cantata the final (eighth) stanza of the hymn "" by Anarg zu Wildenfels.

Bach first performed Erwünschtes Freudenlicht in Leipzig on 30 May 1724, as a rough adaption of BWV 184a. He performed it there again on 3 June 1727 and 15 May 1731.

Music

Scoring and structure 
Bach scored the work for three vocal soloists (soprano (S), alto (A) and tenor (T)), a four-part choir, and a Baroque instrumental ensemble: two transverse flutes (Ft), two violins (Vl), viola (Va), and basso continuo. The duration of the piece has been stated as 25 minutes.

Bach structured the cantata in six movements. A chorale movement, which ends most of his cantatas originally conceived for church use, is here penultimate movement, followed by the only chorus. The first movements are for the soloists: recitatives, a duet and an aria. In the following table of the movements, the scoring follows the Neue Bach-Ausgabe. The keys and time signatures are taken from the book by Bach scholar Alfred Dürr, using the symbols for common time (4/4) and alla breve (2/2). The instruments are shown according to type (winds and strings), while the continuo, playing throughout, is not shown.

Movements

1 
The opening recitative, "" (Desired light of joy), is accompagnato, sung by the tenor and accompanied by two flutes. It was possibly not changed from the original cantata for New Year's Day. The "desired light" is illustrated by a rising motif in the flutes which is repeated throughout the movement. Dürr interprets the figure as the flames mentioned in the Pentecost narration. The movement concludes with an arioso section.

2 
The duet aria is written for soprano and alto voice: "" (Blessed Christians, enraptured flock, come, dwell with Jesus with thankfulness!). It is a da capo aria in triple time with long ritornello episodes. The musicologist Julian Mincham describes it as "retaining a little more of the spirit of the rustic dance". The Bach scholar Klaus Hofmann called it a passepied. The movement was probably already a pastorale in the secular model, and suits the image of the Good Shepherd and his flock. John Eliot Gardiner, who conducted the Bach Cantata Pilgrimage in 2000, believes that the music was actually danced to in the secular version heard in Köthen.

3 
The third movement is a secco tenor recitative: "" (So rejoice, you chosen souls!). It also closes as an arioso, ending the movement in D major rather than the C major in which it began.

4 
The fourth movement is a tenor aria: "" (Happiness and blessing are prepared to crown the consecrated flock). Paczkowski notes that the movement's text deals with the second coming of Christ, using the symbolism of Shepherd and King, common in the Near East. It is formally a trio sonata for voice, solo violin and continuo, in adapted ternary form. It is in B minor, the only movement not in a major key. Gardiner describes it as a minuet.

5 
The penultimate movement is a four-part setting of a chorale stanza: "" (Lord, I hope that you will not leave in any distress). This is unusual for Bach, as typically his church cantatas place the chorale as the final movement.

6 
The closing chorus, "" (Good Shepherd, solace of Your followers, leave us Your holy Word alone!), is a gavotte, basically a duet of soprano and bass, expanded by the choir in the refrains. Bach reused the music of this movement to conclude Laßt uns sorgen, laßt uns wachen, BWV 213, composed for the birthday of Crown Prince Friedrich Christian of Saxony on 5 September 1733.

Recordings 
Gächinger Kantorei / Bach-Collegium Stuttgart, Helmuth Rilling. Die Bach Kantate. Hänssler, 1977.
Knabenchor Hannover & Collegium Vocale Gent, Gustav Leonhardt. J. S. Bach: Das Kantatenwerk · Complete Cantatas / Vol. 42, Teldec, 1987.
Amsterdam Baroque Orchestra & Choir, Ton Koopman. J.S. Bach: Complete Cantatas Vol. 7. Erato, 1997.
Holland Boys Choir / Netherlands Bach Collegium, Pieter Jan Leusink. Bach Edition Vol. 14. Brilliant Classics, 2000.
Monteverdi Choir / English Baroque Soloists, John Eliot Gardiner. Bach Cantatas Vol. 27. Soli Deo Gloria, 2000.
Bach Collegium Japan, Masaaki Suzuki. J.S. Bach: Cantatas Vol. 20. BIS, 2001.

References

Bibliography

External links 
 
 Erwünschtes Freudenlicht BWV 184; BC A 88 / Sacred cantata (3rd Day of Pentecost) Bach Digital
 fragment BWV 184a; BC G 8 / Secular cantata (unknown purpose) Bach Digital
 
 BWV 184 Erwünschtes Freudenlicht English translation, University of Vermont
 Luke Dahn: BWV 184.5 bach-chorales.com

Church cantatas by Johann Sebastian Bach
1724 compositions